Kristína Peláková (born 20 August 1987), known professionally as Kristína, is a Slovak singer. She is best known for representing Slovakia in the Eurovision Song Contest 2010 with the song “Horehronie”. The song placed 16th in the semi-final with a total of 24 points. Kristína is one of the most popular female artists in Slovakia and the Czech Republic, and has toured both countries on multiple occasions.

Kristína started her career as a child singer, dancer and piano player in Svidník, Slovakia. Following the advice of her music teacher, she took singing as her major and attended the Conservatoire (Music School) in Košice. While studying, her favourite place in town was the Jazz Club, where she met Martin Kavulič. He became her producer and helped her to secure a contract with the record label H.o.M.E. Production.

Kristína’s debut single was "Som tvoja" featuring the rapper Opak, released in 2007. Her next single, named "Vráť mi tie hviezdy" became a hit in Slovakia the following year. Her début album "....ešte váham" was released in 2008.

In October 2010, her single "V sieti ťa mám" reached number one on the Slovak airplay chart, making it her third chart-topping single after "Horehronie" earlier that year and "Stonka" in 2009. In October 2010, she released her second studio album, also titled "V sieti ťa mám". It was well received by critics, who praised its contemporary production. Her single “Life Is A Game” was the official song of the 2011 Ice Hockey championship, held in Slovakia.

Since appearing at Eurovision, Kristína has continued to release music, including the compilation album “Tie Naj” in 2014. The album included the hit singles "Rozchodový reggaeton" and "Ta ne" which became her first top ten single in Poland. “Tie Naj” was subsequently certified platinum in Slovakia.

In 2017, Kristína released her fifth album “Mat Srdce” which included the Slovak top-ten singles “Si pre mna best” and “Laska bombova”. This was followed by her first children's album “Snívanky”, released in 2020.

Career

2010: Eurovision Song Contest 
Kristína won the national selection to represent Slovakia in the Eurovision Song Contest 2010 with her song "Horehronie". She got the largest share of television votes and came second in the jury vote. The title of the song, "Horehronie", refers to a rural region in Slovakia. The lyrics of the song tell the story of a heartbroken girl who finds solace in nature. The song was composed by her long-time producer Martin Kavulič. The song peaked at number one on the Slovak airplay chart and became a very popular hit in Slovakia. Despite this, Kristína failed to qualify from the Eurovision Song Contest 2010 semi-final finishing in 16th place. The music video for the song is one of the most viewed on the Eurovision YouTube channel.

2015: Tanec Snov 
In 2015, she was part of Slovak dancing competition Tanec snov, where she was paired with dancer Karol Kotlár and finished as runner-up.

Discography

Albums 
 ....ešte váham (2008)
 V sieti ťa mám (2010)
 Na slnečnej strane sveta (2012)
 Tie Naj (2014)
 Mat Srdce (2017)
 Snívanky (2020)

Singles

Other charted songs

Tours 
 2010-12: Horehronie Tour (Czech Republic and Slovakia)

References

1987 births
Living people
People from Svidník
21st-century Slovak women singers
Eurovision Song Contest entrants of 2010
Eurovision Song Contest entrants for Slovakia